Helenesee station is a railway station near the Helenesee, located in Frankfurt (Oder), Brandenburg, Germany.

Notable places nearby
Helenesee

References

External links

Railway stations in Brandenburg
Buildings and structures in Frankfurt (Oder)